Student quiz shows have appeared on television as both local and national programs since the second half of the 20th century. The following is a list of quiz programs that have aired on local or national television, featuring teams from schools, colleges, or universities in academic competition.

Shows currently on television

Shows no longer on television 

{|class="wikitable sortable"
|-
!Title !! Network !! Region / Media Market !! Original Run
|-
| 1 2 Stri || Grampian Television || Scotland || 2005
|-
| Academic Challenge || KRCR || Redding, California || 1998–2005?
|-
| Academic Challenge || WTVW || Evansville, Indiana  || 2012
|-
| Academic Competition || unknown || Mississippi ||
|-
| Academic Varsity Bowl (formerly Whiz Quiz) || WFAA || Dallas-Fort Worth, Texas || 1977–1985 
|-
| Africa Challenge  (formerly Zain Africa Challenge) || Syndication || East Africa || 2006–2012?
|-
| Alumni Fun || ABCSyndication || United States || 1963–1966
|-
| Answers Please  ("Little Red Schoolhouse" through 1970's) || WRGB || Albany, New York || 1963–1989
|-
| Battle of the Brains || RPN PTV || Philippines || 1992–2001
|-
| Bible Bowl || SyndicationTLC || United States || 197?–198?2015
|-
| Bracket Genius || ESPN2 || United States || 2017
|-
| Brain Blasters || MPT || Maryland || 1998 (pilot)
|-
| Brain Brawl || unknown || Duval County, Florida || 1997?–2013?
|-
| Brain Game || WBNS || Columbus, Ohio || ?
|-
| Brainstorm || WGTE || Toledo, Ohio || 2001?
|-
| Brainstorm || Cox Cable Channel 7 || Phoenix, Arizona || 2007–2009
|-
| Brainstormers || WLIW || Long Island, New York || 1987–1991 
|-
| Braintrust || unknown || Central Illinois || ? 
|-
| Brainwave || Channel 4 San Diego (cable) || San Diego, California || 2008–2009
|-
| City Smarts || WNYE || New York City || 2002 (single season)?
|-
| The Challenge || KTBU || Houston, Texas || 
|-
| Challenge Trophy || Anglia || East Anglia || 1965–1967
|-
| Challenging Times || RTÉ || Ireland || 1991–2001
|-
| College Bowl || CBSNBCSyndicationSyndicationNBCDisney Channel || United States || 1959–19631963–19701978197919841987
|-
| Comcast Academic Challenge || Comcast CN8 || Delaware || 1986–2008
|-
| Cox Academic Tournament(previously Cox Communications Academic Tournament) || Cox-4 || Escambia and Okaloosa counties, Florida || 2001?–2011?
|-
| Face Off Minnesota || TPT || Minneapolis-St. Paul, Minnesota || 2006
|-
| Fast Money MBA Challenge || CNBC || United States || 2008
|- 
| Génies en herbe || Radio-Canada || Québec || 1973–1997
|-
| The Great India Quiz Show || Times Now || Singapore || 2012–2013
|-
| Honda Campus All-Star Challenge || BETSyndication || United States || 1990–1995
|-
| High Five || WFRV || Green Bay, Wisconsin || late 60s
|-
| Hi-Q || CKEM || Edmonton, Alberta ||
|-
| High Q || WHIO || Dayton, Ohio || 1993–2011
|-
| High Q || WAVE || Louisville, Kentucky || 1960–2000?
|-
| High Q || WOWK || Charleston, West Virginia || 1979–1998
|-
| High Q || KGW || Portland, Oregon ||
|-
| High Q || KWCH || Wichita, Kansas ||
|-
| High Q(picked up by KTWU and known as Quest)|| WIBW || Topeka, Kansas ||
|-
| High-Q || WCVB || Boston, MassachusettsMassachusetts || ?–?
|-
| High-Q || WTVT || Tampa Bay, Florida || 1971–1977
|-
| High Quiz Bowl || WSAW  WKBT || Wausau, Wisconsin || 1985?
|-
| High School Bowl || KHNL || Honolulu, Hawaii || 1962–?
|-
| High School Bowl || KSTP || Minneapolis-St. Paul, Minnesota || 196?–1982
|-
| High School Bowl || WTNH || New Haven, Connecticut || 1980–91
|-
| High School Bowl || KHQ || Spokane, Washington || 1970s
|-
| High School Bowl || WWBT || Richmond, Virginia || 1960s–70s
|-
| High School Bowl || WCHS || Charleston, West Virginia || 1970s
|-
| High School Quiz Bowl || WKAR || East Lansing, Michigan || 1970s
|-
| High School Quiz  || WSPD || Toledo, Ohio || 1948–1988
|-
| INL Scholastic Tournament || IPT || Idaho || ?–2012
|-
| Idea Brand Equity Quiz || Times Now || Mumbai, Maharashtra || ?
|-
| Inquizitive || WLYH || Lancaster, Pennsylvania || 2004–2009
|-
| It's Academic || WBEN (1968–86)WGRZ (2008, 2013–14) || Buffalo, New York || 1968–8620082013–14
|-
| It's Academic || WNBQWMAQ || Chicago, Illinois || 1962–1977
|-
| It's Academic || WLWTWCPO-TVWCET || Cincinnati, Ohio || 1963–82
|-
| It's Academic || WNBC || New York City || 1963–1971
|-
| It's Academic || WCVB || Boston, Massachusetts || ?
|-
| It's Academic || KOA || Denver, Colorado || ?
|-
| It's Academic || WTLV || Jacksonville, Florida || 1967–1974
|-
| It's Academic || KNBC|| Los Angeles, California || ?
|-
| It's Academic || WRAL || Raleigh, North Carolina || ?
|-
| It's Academic || TVNZ || New Zealand || 198?
|-
| It's Academic || KYW || Philadelphia, Pennsylvania || 1964–1967
|-
| Jersey Knockout Quiz || Channel Television || Jersey || 1970–1972
|-
|Junior High Quiz Show
|WTAE
|Pittsburgh, Pennsylvania
|1962–1979
|-
|KidQuiz||KCBS || Los Angeles, California || 198?–1992
|- 
| Klassroom Kwiz || WDBJ || Roanoke, Virginia || ?
|-
| Know Your Heritage || WLS  WBBM  WPWR  WCIU || Chicago, Illinois || 1980–2010 || Sundays 10:30am
|-
| M. I. Four: The Ultimate Intelligence Quiz || ZeeQ || India || 2012
|-
| Matchwits || Rocky Mountain PBS || Colorado || 1977 || 
|-
| McDonald's High School Challenge || KXJB || Fargo, North Dakota || 2004–2012 || Saturdays, 6:30pm
|-
| National Quiz || Infoplus || Nepal || 2013
|-
| The New Quiz Kids || Global Television Network || Canada || 1978
|-
| NTV Peace Quiz || Nepal Television || Nepal || 2014
|-
| On Your Marks || Yorkshire Television || Yorkshire || 1994–1995
|-
| Piedmont Quiz Bowl || SCETV || South Carolina || 
|-
| Pop Quiz || WVPT || Harrisonburg, VirginiaShenandoah Valley || 1979–2013
|-
| Prep Quiz Bowl || WDSU || New Orleans, Louisiana || 197?
|-
| Public Library Quiz Bowl || UNC-TV || North Carolina || 1981–2006
|-
| Quiz '88 || Community Access || Ottawa, Ontario || 1988
|-
| Quiz Kids || SyndicationCBS Cable || United States || 1949–19561981–1982
|-
| Quiz Kids || WNAC || Boston, Massachusetts || 1978
|-
| The Quiz Kids || ATN-7GTV-9 || Australia || 1957
|-
| The Quiz Kids Challenge || Syndication || United States || 1990
|-
| Quiz Whiz Junior || Arirang TV || South Korea || 2017
|-
| Remember This? || MSNBC || United States || 1996–1997
|-
| Rutgers Academic Challenge (previously New Jersey Bowl) || NJN || New Jersey ||
|-
| Sabado en Grande || WAPAWJNXWTIN || Puerto Rico || 198?
|-
| Scholars' Bowl || unknown || Virginia || 
|-
| Scholars' Bowl || unknown || Quad Cities, Illinois, Iowa || 
|-
| Scholars' Cup || WTVP || Peoria, Illinois || 197?–2011 ||May
|- 
| Scholars for Dollars || WCFE || Plattsburgh, New York || 1982?-1993?
|- 
| Scholarship Bowl || WNEP || Scranton, PennsylvaniaWilkes-Barre, Pennsylvania || 1990–1991?
|- 
| Scholar Quiz || KMOX-TV || St. Louis, Missouri || c. 1964 – c. 1976
|-
| Scholastic Scoreboard || WHNS || Greenville, South Carolina ||
|-
| Scholastic Bowl || KET || Kentucky ||
|-
| Schools Challenge || Granada Television || United Kingdom || 1997
|-
| Sixth Form Challenge || ITV || United Kingdom || 1966–1967
|-
| SmartAsk || CBC || Canada || 2001
|-
| Sports Challenge || SyndicationCBS || United States || 19711973
|-
| Star Quiz Challenge || Star TV || United Arab Emirates || 2018
|-
| Teen Challenge || WMAZ || Macon, Georgia ||
|-
| Texaco Star Academic Challenge || KPRC || Houston, Texas || 
|-
| Texaco Star National Academic Championship || Discovery Channel || United States || 1989
|-
| Tidewater Challenge || WHRO || Norfolk, Virginia ||
|-
| Top of the Form || BBC 1 || United Kingdom || 1962–1975
|-
| Trivia Plus || Cable Atlantic Public Access || NewfoundlandLabrador || 1991–1992
|-
| TV-3 Challenge || TV-3 || New Jersey || 1970s
|-
| TV Honor Society || WTAP || West Virginia || 1980s
|-
| Ulster Schools Quiz || Ulster TelevisionBBC Northern Ireland || Northern Ireland || 198?–19921999
|-
| University Challenge || ABC || Australia || 1987–1989
|-
| University Challenge || TVNZPrime || New Zealand || 1976–19892014–2016
|-
| University Challenge || BBC World || India || 2003–2005
|-
| Varsity Quiz Bowl || WYES || New Orleans, Louisiana || 1957–1994?
|-
| VIPS Battle of the Books || WYES || Providence, Rhode Island || 2005?
|-
| Virgin Islands Quiz Bowl || WTJX || US Virgin Islands || 2012 ||
|-
| Whiz Bang Quiz Gang || WWOR || New York City || 1992–199?
|-
| Winthrop Challenge || SCETV || South Carolina || 1979–?
|-
| Your Turn || Ulster Television || United Kingdom || 1960–1961
|}

 Quiz bowl in name only 
Although Channel 4 in the UK broadcast a game show titled Quiz Bowl for one series in 1991–92, this was not a quiz bowl per se'', but rather a quiz designed to reflect the flow and scoring of the sport of American football.

References

Televised academic student quiz programs
Quiz